The Water Margin is a 1998 Chinese television series adapted from Shi Nai'an's classical 14th-century novel of the same title. It was produced by CCTV with Zhang Jizhong as producer. It was first broadcast in China in January 1998. The series also featured action choreography by Yuen Woo-ping.

Liu Huan sang the ending theme song for the first 30 episodes while Peng Liyuan (a former singer who is now the First Lady of China) sang the one for the last 13 episodes.

List of episodes

Cast
 Note: Some cast members played multiple roles. Their roles are separated by a slash.

Liangshan heroes

  as Chao Gai
 Li Xuejian as Song Jiang
  as Lu Junyi
 Ning Xiaozhi as Wu Yong
 Wang Yonggui as Gongsun Sheng
 Li Zhenqi as Guan Sheng
  as Lin Chong
 Wang Wensheng as Qin Ming
 Jia Shitou as Huyan Zhuo
 Xiu Qing as Hua Rong
  as Chai Jin
 Yang Zengguang as Zhu Tong
 Zang Jinsheng as Lu Zhishen
  as Wu Song
  as Yang Zhi
 Zhang Hao as Suo Chao
 Wang Jiming as Dai Zong
 Tai Zuhui as Liu Tang
  as Li Kui
 Guo Jun as Shi Jin / Shi Wengong
 Guo Baisong as Lei Heng
 Yang Baoguang as Li Jun
 Liu Weihua as Ruan Xiaoer
 Lan Gongying as Zhang Heng
 Zhang Hengping as Ruan Xiaowu
 Zhang Yakun as Zhang Shun
 Li Dongguo as Ruan Xiaoqi
 Chen Zhihui as Yang Xiong / Wang Jin
  as Shi Xiu
 Kong Qingyuan as Xie Zhen
 Han Fuli as Xie Bao
  as Yan Qing
 You Liping as Zhu Wu
 Qi Jingbin as Sun Li
 Zhen Liqiang as Han Tao
 Wang Chunhui as Peng Qi
 Li Wencheng as Pei Xuan
 Yang Lin as Yan Shun
 Xing Feng as An Daoquan
 Xu Jingyi as Wang Ying
 Zheng Shuang as Hu Sanniang
 Zhu Xiaochun as Tong Wei / Li Da
 Wang Zhongwei as Tong Meng
  as Zheng Tianshou
 Li Baojun as Song Qing
 Zhao Chunming as Cao Zheng
 Hu Longyin as Song Wan
 Qian Weidong as Du Qian
 Chang Yuping as Shi En
 Zhang Lianzhong as Zhu Gui
 Cheng Sihan as Zhu Fu
 Xing Guozhou as Cai Fu / Xue Ba
 Chen Changlong as Cai Qing
 Wei Feng as Jiao Ting
 Zhang Weiguo as Sun Xin
 Zhang Xiuyan as Gu Dasao
 Zhang Xin as Zhang Qing
 Liang Li as Sun Erniang
 Sun Yueming as Bai Sheng
 Meng Gengcheng as Shi Qian

Others

 Zeng Hongsheng as Emperor Huizong
 Tang Guoqiang as Su Shi
  as Li Shishi
 Wei Zongwan as Gao Qiu
 Xiu Ge as young Gao Qiu
  as Gao Yanei
 Ma Xin as Gao Lian
  as Cai Jing
 Quan Jiefang as Cai Jiu
 Li Xiaoding as Liu Menglong
  as Tong Guan
  as Liang Shijie
 Zou Jianzhong as Huang Wenbing
 Wu Liping as "Yuhou" Li
 Cui Dai as Fang La
 Dong Chuanqiang as Fang Mao
 Xu Jian as Fang Tianding
 Wu Song as Pang Wanchun
 Bai Junjie as Luan Tingyu, Zhu Hu
 Jin Guangsheng as Zhu Long
 Li Yusheng as Zhu Biao
 Xie Jiaqi as Zeng Tu / Zeng Suo
 Liu Qiang as Zeng Shen
 Li Shulong as Zeng Sheng
 Guo Jie as Zeng Nong
 Chen Lizhong as Wang Jin's mother
  as Jin Cuilian
 Yang Zhaoquan as Jin Cuilian's father / old depot keeper
 Li Lanfa as Butcher Zheng
 Zhang Hongying as Squire Zhao
 Gu Jinshui as Zhizhen
 Xu Fulai as Abbot
 Zhao Yunsheng as Zhiqing / Zhao Silang / Squire Cao
 Xu Chao as Abbot
 Sun Mingyue as Zhang San
 Wang Quanyou as Lu Qian
  as Lin Chong's wife
 Yang Dong as Jin'er
 Liu Wei as Fu'an
 Zhang Guiyi as Instructor Zhang
 Song Chunlin as Kaifeng magistrate
 Xu Ming as Sun Ding
 Li Yan as Dong Chao
 Chen Jimin as Instructor Hong
 Zhao Yanmin as Wang Lun
 Li Qi as Niu Er
 Hao Liping as Liang Shijie's wife
  as Yuncheng magistrate
 Yang Meng as He Tao
  as He Qing
 Yuan Yuhua as Yan Po
 Mu Qing as Yan Poxi
 Chuo Eryong as Zhang Wenyuan
 Ren Dahui as Song Jiang's father
 Song Wenhua as Wu Dalang
 Brenda Wang as Pan Jinlian
  as Ximen Qing
Li Mingqi as Granny Wang
Guo Chunhua as Yanggu magistrate
Wang Su as Yao Erlang
 Xu Yuting as He Jiu
 Deli Ge'er as Jiang the Door God
 Liu Hongmei as Jiang's wife
 Wang Wenyou as Inspector Zhang
 Jiang Jingyu as Zhang's wife
 Liu Yanfeng as Yulan
  as Liu Gao
 Cui Honghong as Liu Gao's wife
 Lei Dan as Li Gui
 Wu Yujin as Li Gui's wife
 Song Xiuchun as Li Kui's mother
 Niu Li as Pan Qiaoyun
 Liu Xiaoxi as Pei Ruhai
 Zhang Fen as Xu Ning's wife
 Li Zhiyi as Su Yuanjing
 Bi Yuanjin as Li Gu
 Wang Qinzhen as Lu Junyi's wife
 Zhang Chunyan as Pang Qiuxia
 Ni Zengzhao as Ren Yuan
 Zheng Danian as Chen Zongshan
 Zhu Lei as Zhang Ganban
 Wang Xingchi as He Cheng
 Zhang Hongjie as Zhang Shuye
 Pan Yinlai as Hu Cheng
 Zhang Jizhong as Cui Jing

Music
The music for the series was composed by Zhao Jiping.

See also
 The Water Margin (film)
 The Water Margin (1973 TV series)
 Outlaws of the Marsh (TV series)
 All Men Are Brothers (TV series)

External links
 
  The Water Margin on Sina.com

1990s Chinese television series
1998 Chinese television series debuts
1998 Chinese television series endings
Works based on Water Margin
Television series set in the Northern Song
Fictional depictions of Su Shi in television
Mandarin-language television shows
Chinese wuxia television series